EC-Council is a cybersecurity certification, education, training, and services organization based in Albuquerque, New Mexico, that has certified over 237,000 professionals from 145 countries.

History
Jay Bavisi is the Founder of EC-Council Holding Pte Ltd, the parent company of all of EC-Council Group of Companies. The first organization of the group, International Council of Electronic Commerce Consultants (EC-Council) was founded in 2001 in response to the September 11 attacks to certify professionals who could protect against attacks on electronic commerce.

EQT Private Equity invested in EC-Council in September 2021 EC-Council is the creator of popular certification programs such as CEH, CHFI, ECSA/LPT and the Certified Ethical Hacker (CEH) program for white hat hackers in 2003. EC-Council became a certifier of training courses and exams instead of founding entirely new schools, mobilizing entrepreneurs in the information security training business. CEH courses were offered in more than 60 countries by 2007, and the program expanded rapidly.

On February 25, 2010, the United States Department of Defense updated its directive on information security to require its computer network defenders to pass the CEH certification from EC-Council. It was chosen by the Pentagon to oversee training of Department of Defense employees who work in computer security-related jobs.

CEH v12 was released in September 2022.

Certifications
EC-Council offers professional certifications for the IT security field, such as Certified Network Defender (CND), Certified Chief Information Security Officer (CCISO), and Computer Hacking Forensics Investigator (CHFI). It also offers certifications in fields related to IT security, including disaster recovery, software security, digital forensics, and general IT security knowledge.

IT Security professional certifications
Certified Secure Computer User (CSCU)
EC-Council Certified Encryption Specialist (ECES)
EC-Council Certified Security Specialist (ECSS)
Certified Network Defender (CND)
Certified Ethical Hacker (CEH)
Certified Ethical Hacker (Master)
Certified Penetration Tester (CPENT)
Licensed Penetration Tester (Master)
Certified Network Defense Architect (CNDA)
Computer Hacking Forensic Investigator (CHFI)
EC-Council Certified Incident Handler (ECIH)
EC-Council Disaster Recovery Professional (EDRP)
Certified Application Security Engineer (CASE) (Java and .NET)
Certified Blockchain Professional (CBP)
Advanced Network Defense (CAST 614)
EC-Council Certified Chief Information Security Officer (CCISO)
Certified Cloud Security Engineer (CCSE)

Services and products

EC-Council University (ECCU)
EC-Council University (ECCU) was licensed by the Wyoming Board of Education in 2006. It offers bachelor’s and master’s degrees in cybersecurity and graduate certificate programs.

EC-Council CodeRed
EC-Council CodeRed was launched in 2019 as a cybersecurity learning platform with a library of 4,000 video lessons. It provides "microdegrees" on niche technical subjects.

EC-Council Global Services
EC-Council Global Services (EGS) is the consulting services division of the EC-Council Group. It received CREST membership for its cyber incident response, penetration testing, and vulnerability assessment services in 2020.

EC-Council Aware
EC-Council Aware is a cybersecurity training app that was launched in 2020 for iOS and Android.

EC-Council CyberQ
EC-Council launched its CyberQ platform in 2020. It is a cloud-based cyber range platform that automates the process of using cloud technology to deploy cyber targets.

EC-Council events
EC-Council hosts various IT security conferences including Hacker Halted, Global CyberLympics, TakeDownCon, and Global CISO Forum.

References

Information technology qualifications
Professional titles and certifications